Charles Allen Sumner (August 2, 1835 – January 31, 1903) was an American lawyer and politician who served two terms as a U.S. Representative from California from 1883 to 1885.

Early life
Born in Great Barrington, Massachusetts, Sumner attended Trinity College in Hartford, Connecticut, but did not graduate. He subsequently studied law, but was chiefly interested in stenography. He was admitted to the bar and engaged in patent practice.

California
He moved to California in 1856 and settled in San Francisco where he reported for the legislature from 1857 to 1861. Between the legislative sessions he was engaged in the state and county courts, in law-reporting, and general editorial duties. In 1860, he was involved in political campaigning for the Republican Party.
He became editor of the Herald and Mirror in 1861. His opposition to the “Shafter” land bill succeeded in defeating it.

Civil War
During the American Civil War he was appointed, on November 26, 1862, to be captain and assistant quartermaster of United States Volunteers, and served until his resignation on March 30, 1864.

Nevada
He moved to Virginia City, Nevada where he served as member of the Nevada State Senate from 1865 to 1868 and served as president pro tempore for one session. During this time, he was twice an unsuccessful candidate for U.S. Representative.

Return to San Francisco
He returned to San Francisco in 1868 and became editor of the Herald where he advocated a government postal telegraph.
He was appointed official note-taker of the city, and in 1875 and 1880 official reporter of the supreme court.

U.S. Representative
After an unsuccessful attempt in 1878, he was elected as a Democrat to the Forty-eighth Congress (March 4, 1883 – March 3, 1885). There he opposed the Pacific railroads, and introduced a postal telegraph bill. He was an unsuccessful candidate for reelection in 1884.

Later life
He resumed the practice of law.
Trinity gave him the degree of A. M. in 1887.
He died in San Francisco, California on January 31, 1903, and was interred in the George H. Thomas Post plot at the Presidio.

Publications
 Shorthand and Reporting (New York, 1882)
 Golden Gate Sketches (1884)
 Travel in Southern Europe (1885)
 Sumners' Poems (with his brother, Samuel B. Summer, 1887)

Notes

References

External links

1835 births
1903 deaths
People from Great Barrington, Massachusetts
Nevada Unionists
Nevada state senators
Democratic Party members of the United States House of Representatives from California
Union Army officers
19th-century American politicians
Military personnel from Massachusetts